The Old Rectory is a grade II listed house in Old Church Street, Chelsea, London.

House and gardens

The current house mostly dates to about 1725, the early Georgian period, but the site itself was given by the Marquis of Winchester in 1566. The Old Rectory has two acres of gardens, the largest private garden in London apart from Buckingham Palace and Witanhurst.

Nineteenth century

It was formerly home to the rector of Chelsea parish church, which was Chelsea Old Church, which dates from 1157, until the larger St Luke's Church, Chelsea was consecrated in 1824, when the rector from 1805 to 1832 was George Valerian Wellesley, brother of the Duke of Wellington. 

From 1824 to 1830, Henry Blunt was George Wellesley's curate, then became the first rector of Trinity Church in Sloane Street, but turned down the post of rector of St Luke's offered to him by Lord Cadogan.

Other notable rectors have included Charles Kingsley Sr (rector from 1836 to 1860), father of Charles Kingsley author of The Water Babies, and Henry Blunt's son Gerald Blunt, father of Chelsea historian Reginald Blunt.

Twentieth century and later
From 1990 to 1994, it was refurbished under the supervision of the South African developers Collett and Champion (Anthony Collett and David Champion), with funding provided by the Japanese businessman, Norikazu Nemoto, with all three being directors of Toyoko Metropolitan Company (TMC). Two "huge wings" were added, with ten bedroom suites and a "massive ballroom". It was being marketed at around £25 million, and they were also developing the next-door 58 Old Church Street. In February 1995, it sold for £22 million to Greek shipping magnate Theodore Angelopoulos, and was for many years London's largest and most expensive property sale in the UK.

In 2001, Norwegian shipping magnate John Fredriksen bought the property for £37 million. In 2004, it was reported in The Evening Standard that Roman Abramovich had offered £100 million for the 30,000 square feet house even though it was not for sale. In 2012, The Washington Post reported the property was "worth US$172 million". In 2015, The Tatler included the Old Rectory in their list of "The best private ballrooms". Country Life reported the house discreetly listed in 2020.

List of rectors
The rectory has had the following rectors since it has been at its present location:

1566, Robert Richardson
1569/70–1574, John Churchman
1574–1585, Thomas Browne STB
1585–1615, Richard Ward
1615–1632, George Hambden STP
1632–1669, Samuel Wilkinson STP
1669/70–1694, Adam Littleton DD
1694–1732, John King DD. King found the Rectory in very poor repair and lived in another house in Church Street until 1703.
1732–1766, Sloane Elsmere
1766–1770, Reginald Heber, father of Reginald Heber (1783-1826), Bishop of Calcutta
1770–1775, Thomas Drake LLD
1775–1797, William Bromley Cadogan, second son of Charles Cadogan, 1st Earl Cadogan
1797–1805, Charles Sturgess
1805–1832, Hon. G. V. Wellesley
1832–1836, John William Lockwood MA
1836–1860, Charles Kingsley MA

References

Chelsea, London
Houses completed in 1725
Georgian architecture in London
Houses in the Royal Borough of Kensington and Chelsea
Grade II listed houses in London
Grade II listed buildings in the Royal Borough of Kensington and Chelsea